The 1996 Pupp Czech Open, also known as the WTA Karlovy Vary,  was a women's tennis tournament played on outdoor clay courts in Karlovy Vary in the Czech Republic that was part of Tier IV of the 1996 WTA Tour. It was the only edition of the tournament and was held from 10 September until 15 September 1996. Fifth-seeded Ruxandra Dragomir won the singles title.

Finals

Singles

 Ruxandra Dragomir defeated  Patty Schnyder 6–2, 3–6, 6–4
 It was Dragomir's 2nd title of the year and the 4th of her career.

Doubles

 Karina Habšudová /  Helena Suková defeated  Eva Martincová /  Elena Pampoulova 3–6, 6–3, 6–2
 It was Habšudová's only title of the year and the 1st of her career. It was Suková's 3rd title of the year and the 75th of her career.

References

External links
 Main Draw on ITF website

Pupp Czech Open
1996 in Czech tennis
1996 Pupp Czech Open